Clementon is a borough in Camden County, in the U.S. state of New Jersey. As of the 2020 United States census, the borough's population was 5,338, an increase of 338 (+6.8%) from the 2010 census count of 5,000, which in turn reflected an increase of 14 (+0.3%) from the 4,986 counted in the 2000 census.

The borough had the 27th-highest property tax rate in New Jersey, with an equalized rate of 4.179% in 2020, compared to 3.470% in the county as a whole and a statewide average of 2.279%.

History
Around 1800, Jonathon Haines built a glass factory in what is now Clementon, situated on a large hill across the street from the modern day Clementon Park. Large amounts of dirt, gravel and marl from the large hill the glass works were situated on were removed for use at a planned new post office in 1961. Sometime around 1811, Samuel Clement of Haddonfield purchased the glass works and named them the Gloucester Glass works, and named the small settlement around the plant as Clementon village. Haines remained as a superintendent and at some point repurchased the works from Clement.

The Borough of Clementon was created on February 13, 1925, from Clementon Township, one of nine municipalities created from the now-defunct township, based on the results of a referendum held on March 17, 1925.

Geography
According to the United States Census Bureau, the borough had a total area of 1.95 square miles (5.05 km2), including 1.89 square miles (4.90 km2) of land and 0.06 square miles (0.15 km2) of water (2.97%).

The borough is located on Clementon Lake, which is the site of the Clementon Amusement Park. The amusement park was home to the Jack Rabbit, a wooden roller coaster constructed in 1919 by the Philadelphia Toboggan Company. Though quite tame in comparison to modern steel coasters, it remained popular with park visitors. It was one of the oldest remaining coasters in the country when it was taken out of service in 2002 and ultimately demolished in 2007.

Rowands Pond Wildlife Management Area, covering , is located in Clementon.

Unincorporated communities, localities and place names located partially or completely within the borough include Brownsville and Gordon Lake.

Clementon borders Berlin Borough, Lindenwold, Pine Hill and Pine Valley.

Demographics

2010 census

The Census Bureau's 2006–2010 American Community Survey showed that (in 2010 inflation-adjusted dollars) median household income was $40,185 (with a margin of error of +/− $4,676) and the median family income was $57,184 (+/− $7,155). Males had a median income of $40,987 (+/− $7,918) versus $34,063 (+/− $3,762) for females. The per capita income for the borough was $22,597 (+/− $2,393). About 7.8% of families and 13.5% of the population were below the poverty line, including 20.3% of those under age 18 and 7.3% of those age 65 or over.

2000 census
As of the 2000 United States census there were 4,986 people, 1,978 households, and 1,246 families residing in the borough. The racial makeup of the borough was 82.23% White, 11.57% African American, 0.22% Native American, 0.92% Asian, 0.18% Pacific Islander, 2.35% from other races, and 2.53% from two or more races. 4.13% of the population were Hispanic or Latino of any race.

There were 1,978 households, out of which 30.3% had children under the age of 18 living with them, 40.8% were married couples living together, 15.4% had a female householder with no husband present, and 37.0% were non-families. 29.5% of all households were made up of individuals, and 9.9% had someone living alone who was 65 years of age or older. The average household size was 2.52 and the average family size was 3.13.

In the borough the population was spread out, with 24.7% under the age of 18, 8.6% from 18 to 24, 33.5% from 25 to 44, 22.1% from 45 to 64, and 11.1% who were 65 years of age or older. The median age was 35 years. For every 100 females, there were 93.3 males. For every 100 females age 18 and over, there were 90.5 males.

The median income for a household in the borough was $42,207, and the median income for a family was $50,963. Males had a median income of $33,879 versus $29,777 for females. The per capita income for the borough was $18,510. 11.4% of the population and 9.3% of families were below the poverty line. Out of the total population, 12.6% of those under the age of 18 and 14.8% of those 65 and older were living below the poverty line.

Economy
Clementon is home to Giambri's Quality Sweets, a long-established candy and chocolate maker that was founded in South Philadelphia in 1942 and moved to New Jersey in the early 1970s.

Government

Local government
Clementon is governed under the Borough form of New Jersey municipal government, which is used in 218 municipalities (of the 564) statewide, making it the most common form of government in New Jersey. The governing body is comprised of a Mayor and a Borough Council, with all positions elected at-large on a partisan basis as part of the November general election. A Mayor is elected directly by the voters to a four-year term of office. The Borough Council is comprised of six members elected to serve three-year terms on a staggered basis, with two seats coming up for election each year in a three-year cycle. The Borough form of government used by Clementon is a "weak mayor / strong council" government in which council members act as the legislative body with the mayor presiding at meetings and voting only in the event of a tie. The mayor can veto ordinances subject to an override by a two-thirds majority vote of the council. The mayor makes committee and liaison assignments for council members, and most appointments are made by the mayor with the advice and consent of the council.  A council president is selected annually from among their own members by the council and presides in the absence of the mayor. The council has all executive responsibilities not specifically assigned to the mayor.

, the Mayor of the Borough of Clementon is Democrat Thomas J. Weaver, whose term of office ends December 31, 2023. Members of the Clementon Borough Council are Gwendolyn Cantwell (D, 2022; appointed to an unexpired term), Robert L. Dorsey (D, 2024), Brenda Franks (R, 2023), Christopher McKelvey (D, 2022; appointed to an unexpired term), Thomas Shaw (D, 2022) and Holly Strobl (D, 2023).

Federal, state and county representation
Clementon is located in the 1st Congressional District and is part of New Jersey's 4th state legislative district.

Politics
As of March 2011, there were a total of 2,945 registered voters in Clementon, of which 1,063 (36.1%) were registered as Democrats, 407 (13.8%) were registered as Republicans and 1,472 (50.0%) were registered as Unaffiliated. There were 3 voters registered as Libertarians or Greens.

In the 2012 presidential election, Democrat Barack Obama received 67.6% of the vote (1,316 cast), ahead of Republican Mitt Romney with 31.2% (607 votes), and other candidates with 1.3% (25 votes), among the 1,970 ballots cast by the borough's 3,289 registered voters (22 ballots were spoiled), for a turnout of 59.9%. In the 2008 presidential election, Democrat Barack Obama received 61.9% of the vote (1,276 cast), ahead of Republican John McCain, who received around 33.9% (700 votes), with 2,063 ballots cast among the borough's 3,049 registered voters, for a turnout of 67.7%. In the 2004 presidential election, Democrat John Kerry received 60.7% of the vote (1,183 ballots cast), outpolling Republican George W. Bush, who received around 37.0% (721 votes), with 1,949 ballots cast among the borough's 2,780 registered voters, for a turnout percentage of 70.1.

In the 2013 gubernatorial election, Republican Chris Christie received 58.3% of the vote (638 cast), ahead of Democrat Barbara Buono with 39.3% (430 votes), and other candidates with 2.4% (26 votes), among the 1,141 ballots cast by the borough's 3,379 registered voters (47 ballots were spoiled), for a turnout of 33.8%. In the 2009 gubernatorial election, Democrat Jon Corzine received 48.3% of the vote (529 ballots cast), ahead of both Republican Chris Christie with 42.7% (468 votes) and Independent Chris Daggett with 5.8% (63 votes), with 1,095 ballots cast among the borough's 2,950 registered voters, yielding a 37.1% turnout.

Education
The Clementon School District serves public school students in pre-kindergarten through eighth grade at Clementon Elementary School. As of the 2021–22 school year, the district, comprised of one school, had an enrollment of 553 students and 54.1 classroom teachers (on an FTE basis), for a student–teacher ratio of 10.2:1.

Public school students in ninth through twelfth grades attend Overbrook High School in Pine Hill as part of a sending/receiving relationship with the Pine Hill Schools. The high school also serves the community of Berlin Township as part of a sending/receiving relationship. As of the 2021–22 school year, the high school had an enrollment of 733 students and 61.6 classroom teachers (on an FTE basis), for a student–teacher ratio of 11.9:1.

Transportation

Roads and highways

U.S. Route 30 (White Horse Pike) is the main highway serving Clementon.

Public transportation
NJ Transit bus service is provided on the 403 route between Turnersville and Camden, as well as between the Lindenwold station and Atlantic City on the 554 route.

Notable people

People who were born in, residents of, or otherwise closely associated with Clementon include:

 Arthur Rose Eldred (1895–1951), agricultural and railroad industry executive, civic leader, and the first Eagle Scout in the Boy Scouts of America
 Arnie Fisher (born 1938), professional bridge player, bridge author, university instructor and businessman
 Walter E. Pedersen (1911–1998), politician and businessman who served as mayor of Clementon and in the New Jersey General Assembly

References

External links

 Clementon Borough municipal website
 Clementon School District
 
 School Data for the Clementon School District, National Center for Education Statistics

 
1925 establishments in New Jersey
Borough form of New Jersey government
Boroughs in Camden County, New Jersey
Populated places established in 1925